The Waiatarua Reserve is a nature reserve on the eastern Auckland isthmus in New Zealand, close to the suburbs of Remuera, Meadowbank and St Johns. Originally the site of a freshwater lake, Waiatarua was drained in 1929. Since 1987, the reserve has been redeveloped as an urban wetland.

Geology 

Lake Waiatarua formed after the eruption of Maungarei / Mount Wellington, when a lava flow blocked the flow of a river valley which flowed into the Tāmaki River, approximately 9,000 years ago.

History

The traditional Tāmaki Māori name for the lake, Waiatarua, means the "Waters of Reflection". The lake was an important freshwater resource for Ngāti Whātua Ōrākei, prior to European settlement. During the early colonial period of New Zealand, it was named Lake St John.

The land adjoining the lake was acquired by Bishop Selwyn in 1851, as a part of the grounds of the St John's College. In the 1870s, it was considered as a source for drinking water for the city of Auckland, however this plan did not eventuate.

In 1908 the Waiatarua Drainage Board was formed, intending to drain the swamplands around the lake, despite wide public opposition to the plan. A tunnel was constructed underneath Remuera Road, in order to drain the lake into the Ōrākei Basin, which was completed by 1929. In 1934, the Remuera Golf Club was established on leased land to the east of the site of the drained lake.

In 1987, the reserve was developed into an artificial wetland. It is currently the largest wetland restoration project in New Zealand, and in 2006 Auckland City won the Arthur Mead Environmental Award due to the restoration efforts.

References

Constructed wetlands
Protected areas of the Auckland Region
Nature reserves in New Zealand
Ōrākei Local Board Area
Urban forests in New Zealand
Wetlands of New Zealand